Farasiko Tokarei is a Fijian rugby league footballer who represented Fiji national rugby league team in the 2000 World Cup.

In 2000 he played club football for the Tumbarumba Greens in the Group 9 Rugby League competition. In 2003 Tokarei was the player-coach of the Nabua Broncos. After residing in Australia as a resident he won the 2019 Scott Hargreaves Murray Cup with Tumbarumba

References

Living people
Year of birth missing (living people)
Fijian rugby league coaches
Fijian rugby league players
Fiji national rugby league team players
Rugby league wingers
Place of birth missing (living people)